The Chicago Black Hawks were an all-African American professional football team established in 1928 by Fritz Pollard (who was also the team's quarterback, running back, coach, and owner). The Black Hawks played against white teams around Chicago, but enjoyed their greatest success by scheduling exhibition games against West Coast teams during the winter months.

Due to poor attendance and the country's economic situation, the team played most of its games on the road, and disbanded three years later in 1932 while playing on the West Coast. Fritz Pollard would return to barnstorming in 1936 with the Harlem Brown Bombers.

References

American football teams in Chicago
American football teams established in 1928
1928 establishments in Illinois
American football teams disestablished in 1932
1932 disestablishments in Illinois
African-American history of Illinois